Toada is a style of Central Amazonian folk music now moving into the mainstream in Brazil. It is a combination of traditional Amazonian rhythms with African and European influence. The genre was made known throughout Brazil after Amazonian group Carrapicho's hit "Tic Tic Tac".

See also
 Bumba Meu Boi

Dance in Brazil
South American music